Nicolas Mahut and Édouard Roger-Vasselin were the defending champions, but Mahut chose not to defend the title and Roger-Vasselin chose to compete in Stockholm instead.

Kevin Krawietz and Andreas Mies won the title, defeating Rajeev Ram and Joe Salisbury in the final, 7–6(7–1), 6–3.

Seeds

Draw

Draw

References

External Links
 Main Draw

European Open - Doubles
2019 Doubles